Events in the year 1702 in Spain.

Incumbents
Monarch: Philip V

Events
August 23-late September - Battle of Cádiz (1702)
October 23 - Battle of Vigo Bay

Births
April 20 - Zenón de Somodevilla, 1st Marqués de la Ensenada, Secretary of State 1748-1754 (b. 1781)

References

 
1700s in Spain